Kulikovka is a rural locality (a selo) in Mikhaylovskoye Rural Settlement, Kantemirovsky District, Voronezh Oblast, Russia. The population was 928 as of 2010. There are 8 streets.

Geography 
Kulikovka is located 42 km northwest of Kantemirovka (the district's administrative centre) by road. Bondarevo is the nearest rural locality.

References 

Rural localities in Kantemirovsky District